Joseph H. Berke, M.D., (January 17, 1939 – January 11, 2021) was an American–born psychotherapist, author and lecturer. He studied at Columbia College of Columbia University and graduated from the Albert Einstein College of Medicine in New York.  Berke moved to London in 1965 where he worked with R. D. Laing in the 1960s when the Philadelphia Association was being established. Berke was a resident at Kingsley Hall, where he helped Mary Barnes, a nurse who had been diagnosed with schizophrenia, emerge from madness. Barnes later became an artist and writer. A stage play based on the book that Berke and Barnes wrote together (Mary Barnes: Two Accounts of a Journey Through Madness) was adapted as a stage play by David Edgar. A film adaptation of the book is currently under consideration. Berke collaborated on a number of projects with Laing, including the Dialectics of Liberation international conference in London, July 15–30, 1967, where he was the principal organizer.
Berke worked as a psychoanalytic psychotherapist for individuals and families. He was the co-founder of the Arbours Association in London in 1970, and the founder and director of the Arbours Crisis Centre (1973-2010) in London. He was the author of many articles and books on psychological, social, and religious themes. Berke died in London on January 11, 2021. A great part of Joseph Berke's estate is held at the PET Archives and Collections: Personal papers of Dr Joseph Berke including materials relating to the Institute of Phenomenological Studies, Research Committee on Cannabis, Fire Magazine and Arbours Association. Alongside these materials are the professional papers of Berke including notes for two publications 'Paranoia and Persecution' and 'Beyond Madness'. Within the collection is a series of correspondence regarding the Dialectics of Liberation Congress 1967.

Selected bibliography

Berke is the author of many articles and books on psychological, social, political and religious themes, including:
 Mary Barnes: Two Accounts of a Journey through Madness (with Mary Barnes)(2002) 3rd Edition, New York: Other Press
 The Cannabis Experience: An Interpretative Study of the Effects of Marijuana and Hashish (with Calvin Hernton) (1974), London: Peter Owen
 I Haven't Had To Go Mad Here (1979) Pelican Books
 The Tyranny of Malice: Exploring the Dark Side of Character and Culture (1988) NY: Summit Books
 Sanctuary: The Arbours Experience of Alternative Community Care (co-editor)(1995) London: Process Press
 Even Paranoids Have Enemies: New Perspectives on Paranoia and Persecution (co-editor).(1998)London: Routledge
 Beyond Madness: PsychoSocial Interventions in Psychosis (co-editor)(2001) London: Jessica Kingsley

His recent books include: Malice Through the Looking Glass (2009) 2nd Edition, London: Teva Publications 
Centers of Power: The Convergence of Psychoanalysis and Kabbalah (with Stanley Schneider)(2008) NY: Jason Aronson
Why I Hate You and You Hate Me: The Interplay of Envy, Greed, Jealousy and Narcissism (2013) London: Karnac Books
and The Hidden Freud: His Hassidic Roots (2015) London: Karnac Books

See also 
 R. D. Laing
 Mary Barnes
 David Smail (psychologist)

References

External links 
 Joseph Berke's website
 Joseph Berke's archive is held at Wellcome Collection, London. 
 Research Gate profile
 Arbours Crisis Centre
 Trick or Treat:The Divided Self of R D Laing 

1939 births
2021 deaths
Columbia College (New York) alumni
Albert Einstein College of Medicine alumni
Family therapists
British psychiatrists
British psychoanalysts
Schizophrenia researchers